Crusoe Island (Registered as Riverview and locally known as just Crusoe) is an unincorporated community home to just a few families in The Green Swamp bordering the Waccamaw River and just south of Lake Waccamaw in  Columbus County, North Carolina, United States.

Notes

Unincorporated communities in Columbus County, North Carolina
Unincorporated communities in North Carolina